In heraldry, an ordinary is described as quadrate (or more fully nowy quadrate) when it has a square central boss.

Only certain ordinaries are usually shown quadrate: the cross, the pale, and the fess – but not, for example, a bordure or chevron. 

A saltire quadrate has the square lozengeways:

External links
 Former arms of Freebridge Lynn Rural District Council, showing a cross quadrate.
 Former arms of Cannock Urban District Council, showing a cross potent quadrate.

Heraldic charges
Heraldic ordinaries